Rex Levi Baker was a Republican member of the North Carolina General Assembly representing the state's ninety-first House district, including constituents in Forsyth, Stokes and Surry counties. A retired business owner from King, North Carolina, Baker was defeated in the 2004 Republican primary by Bryan Holloway.

Electoral history

2004

2002

2000

References

|-

Republican Party members of the North Carolina House of Representatives
Living people
1938 births
21st-century American politicians
People from King, North Carolina